These quarterbacks have started at least one game for the Denver Broncos of the National Football League. They are listed in order of the date of each player's first start at quarterback for the team.

Starting quarterbacks

The number of games they started during the season is listed to the right:

Regular season

† In Week 12 of the 2020 NFL season against the New Orleans Saints, backup quarterback Jeff Driskel tested positive for COVID-19 and all of Denver's quarterbacks were ruled ineligible due to being close contacts with him. As a result, practice squad receiver Kendall Hinton, who had some experience at quarterback, was activated to play in the game as the Broncos' primary passer. However, as the Broncos lined up in wildcat formation with running back Phillip Lindsay under center for the first four plays, Lindsay technically started the game at quarterback. But also Hinton became the first non-quarterback to play significant snaps at the position in an NFL game since running back Tom Matte with the Baltimore Colts in 1965.

Post-season

Most games as starting quarterback
These quarterbacks have the most starts for the Broncos in regular season games (through the 2018 NFL season).

Team career passing records

Through the 2018 NFL season

See also
 List of American Football League players
 List of NFL starting quarterbacks

References

 Denver Broncos Team Encyclopedia

Denver Broncos

quarterbacks